Kienus P. Boulware is an American football coach. He is the defensive coordinator and defensive tackles coach at Alabama A&M University, a position he has held since 2022. Boulware served as the head football coach at Winston-Salem State University in Winston-Salem, North Carolina from 2014 to 2018, compiling a record of 35–18. He was fired from his post at Winston-Salem State in April 2019 following an altercation between two of his players. Boulware played college football at the University of North Carolina at Chapel Hill as a linebacker.

Head coaching record

References

External links
 Alabama A&M profile

Year of birth missing (living people)
Living people
American football linebackers
Alabama A&M Bulldogs football coaches
Livingstone Blue Bears football coaches
North Carolina Central Eagles football coaches
North Carolina Tar Heels football coaches
North Carolina Tar Heels football players
Shaw Bears football coaches
Winston-Salem State Rams football coaches
People from Thomasville, North Carolina
Players of American football from North Carolina
African-American coaches of American football
African-American players of American football
20th-century African-American sportspeople
21st-century African-American sportspeople